American Idols Live! Tour 2006 was a summer concert tour in the United States featuring the top 10 contestants of the fifth season of American Idol, which aired in 2006. It was sponsored by Kellogg Pop-Tarts. The tour started on July 5 and ended on September 24 covering 60 dates, the biggest tour thus far.  Initially 39 dates were planned, but 21 extra dates were later added due to demand. It followed in the tradition of other American Idol summer tours following the completion of each season in May.

Runner-up Katharine McPhee missed the first 17 shows of the tour due to severe bronchitis and laryngitis, She also missed her first rescheduled show on July 27 in Pittsburgh, Pennsylvania due to cancelled flight caused by bad weather.   At the concert in Charlotte, North Carolina, McPhee tripped backstage before going on, and a hair-line fracture to her left foot was later discovered when she was taken to a hospital after the show.

Bucky Covington was absent from the August 13 performance at the Savvis Center in St. Louis due to an illness. Kellie Pickler was absent from the first Atlanta show on August 3.

Performers

Show overview
The show featured a series of individual performances with each contestant performing a set of songs.  Many also performed a duet with the next performer in the transition between the sets of songs.  In the first half the contestants performed in random order, in the second half the last four performed in elimination order, starting with Chris Daughtry and ending with Taylor Hicks. The second half also featured a number of group songs, with a traditional group performance ending the show.  Some changes were made in the earlier shows due to the absence of Katharine McPhee.

Setlist
 Mandisa – "I'm Every Woman" (Chaka Khan), "If I Was Your Woman" (Alicia Keys)
 Mandisa and Ace Young – "I'm Your Angel" (R. Kelly & Celine Dion) 
 Young – "Father Figure" (George Michael), "Harder to Breathe" (Maroon 5) 
 Lisa Tucker – "Signed, Sealed, Delivered I'm Yours" (Stevie Wonder), "Your Song" (Elton John), "Someone Saved My Life Tonight" (Elton John)
 Tucker and Paris Bennett – "Waterfalls" (TLC)
 Bennett – "Midnight Train to Georgia" (Gladys Knight & the Pips), "Crazy in Love" (Beyoncé Knowles & Jay-Z)
 Bucky Covington – "Superstition" (Stevie Wonder), "Drift Away" (Dobie Gray)  
 Covington and Kellie Pickler – "You're the One That I Want" (John Travolta & Olivia Newton-John) 
 Pickler – "Walkin' After Midnight" (Patsy Cline)/Something To Talk About (Bonnie Raitt), "I'm the Only One" (Melissa Etheridge)

Intermission

 Chris Daughtry – "Whole Lotta Love" (Led Zeppelin), "Wanted Dead or Alive" (Bon Jovi), "Renegade" (Styx)
 Daughtry and Elliott Yamin – "Savin' Me" (Nickelback) 
 Yamin –  "Never Too Much" (Luther Vandross), "Trouble" (Elvis Presley),  "Moody's Mood For Love" (James Moody)
 Covington, Young, Daughtry and Yamin – "Patience" (Guns N' Roses)
 Mandisa, Tucker, Pickler and Bennett – "Man! I Feel Like a Woman!" (Shania Twain), "I'm a Woman" (Peggy Lee)
 Katharine McPhee – "Black Horse and the Cherry Tree" (KT Tunstall), "Somewhere Over the Rainbow" (Judy Garland), and "Think" (Aretha Franklin)
 Taylor Hicks – "Jailhouse Rock" (Elvis Presley), "Hollywood Nights" (Bob Seger), "Sweet Soul Music" (Arthur Conley), "What's Going On" (Marvin Gaye), "Living for the City" (Stevie Wonder), "Don't Let Me Down" (The Beatles), "Do I Make You Proud" (Taylor Hicks), "Takin' It to the Streets" (The Doobie Brothers) 
 Tucker, Mandisa, Covington, Young, Pickler, Bennett, Daughtry and Yamin – "We Are the Champions" (Queen)
 Top 10 – "Living in America" (James Brown)

Additional notes
 Katharine McPhee joined the tour after her illness for the July 28 show in Washington, D.C.  She did two solo numbers – "Black Horse and the Cherry Tree" and "Somewhere Over The Rainbow" and the group number "Living in America".  She sang just two solo songs until San Diego when she added "Think".
 Kellie Pickler was sick for the first Atlanta show on August 3, 2006.
 Katharine McPhee performed in bare feet after she fractured her foot in Charlotte, North Carolina (not in slipper-sandals or gardening slippers that had widely been reported), and performed barefoot for the rest of the tour. She wore a cast on her left foot after the accident until August 22 in St. Paul, Minnesota.
 The girl's group songs "I'm A Woman", "Man! I Feel Like A Woman" were removed from the set list soon after Katharine's return.
 Taylor Hicks also removed "Sweet Soul Music", "What's Going On", and "Don't Let Me Down" from his song list. 
 Taylor Hicks' band LiMBO also toured at the same time as the American Idol tour, following many stops of the American Idol tour.  Taylor Hicks often performed at their 'after-party' shows, occasionally along with some of his fellow American Idol finalists.

Tour dates

Response 
The 2006 tour was a huge success, with an average attendance of 96.1% capacity, and 20 of its shows sold out.  It ranked as the thirteenth biggest grossing tour of 2006 in the Billboard year end chart, with a gross of $35,291,883 that doubled the previous season's revenue, and 646,996 tickets sold as totalled from the 59 shows reported to Billboard.  It is still the most successful Idol tour yet.

Tour summary
Number of shows – 60 (20 sold out)
Total gross – $35,829,661 (60 shows)
Total attendance – 656,550 (60 shows)
Average attendance – 10,943 (96%)
Average ticket price – $54.57
Highest gross – Philadelphia, Pennsylvania – $791,159
Lowest gross – Syracuse, New York – $357,758
Highest attendance – Greensboro, North Carolina – 15,337 (100%)
Lowest attendance – Syracuse, New York – 6,048 (94%)

References

American Idol concert tours
2006 concert tours